Carolyn Lawrence (born February 13, 1967),  is an American television, film and voice actress, and real estate agent. She is known for her voice roles on Nickelodeon animated shows, including Sandy Cheeks on SpongeBob SquarePants, Cindy Vortex on Jimmy Neutron, and Mandragora on Winx Club as well as the title character on Adult Swim original series Moral Orel.

Life and career
Lawrence left high school to take dance classes in Chicago.Since then, she began her long-running role as Sandy Cheeks on SpongeBob SquarePants. She was also the voice of Cindy Vortex in the film Jimmy Neutron: Boy Genius and its spinoff series The Adventures of Jimmy Neutron, Boy Genius, as well as the title character, Orel Puppington, in Moral Orel. Lawrence is the voice of Ashley Graham, the US president's daughter, in all releases of the survival horror video game Resident Evil 4. She plays Christy Allison on the video podcast Goodnight Burbank.

Lawrence has 2 children. She is also a licensed real estate agent.

Filmography

Film and television

Video games

Audiobooks

References

External links

 
 

Living people
American voice actresses
American video game actresses
American television actresses
Audiobook narrators
20th-century American actresses
21st-century American women
1967 births